Drasteria sesquistria is a moth of the family Erebidae. It is found in Russia, Kazakhstan, Afghanistan, Uzbekistan, Tajikistan, Kyrgyzstan, Turkmenistan and Mongolia.

The wingspan is about 28 mm. Adults are on wing from April to July.

References

Drasteria
Moths described in 1854
Moths of Asia